Rauvolfia verticillata, the common devil pepper, is a plant in the family Apocynaceae. The specific epithet verticillata means "whorled" and refers to the plant's leaves.

Description
The bark is yellowish black or brown. Inflorescences bear up to 35 or more flowers. The flowers feature a white or pinkish corolla.

Distribution and habitat
Rauvolfia verticillata is native to China and tropical Asia from India to the Philippines. It grows in a variety of habitats, from sea-level to  altitude.

Uses
Rauvolfia verticillata is used in traditional Chinese medicine, including as a treatment for snakebite, malaria, typhus and hypertension.

References

verticillata
Plants used in traditional Chinese medicine
Flora of tropical Asia
Flora of China
Plants described in 1790
Taxa named by Henri Ernest Baillon
Taxa named by João de Loureiro